This list is a non-exhaustive list of paintings by Georges Lebacq. Certain paintings or drawings have disappeared. Others are in Beaux-Arts Museum of Mons, the Royal Museums of Fine Arts of Belgium in Brussels, and the Museum of Hunting in Senlis, France.

Belgian period

 Petite dune (Wenduyne sur mer – Flandre)
 Une Ferme en Flandre
 Pignon à Reninghe (Flandre)
 La rue du Corbeau (Bruges – Flandre)
 Neige (Bruges – Flandre) Sketch, private Collection
 Chaland à Bruges (Bruges – Flandre) Drawing
 Canal à Bruges (Bruges – Flandre) Drawing, BAM (Beaux-Arts Museum of Mons (Belgium)
 A Knocke (Knocke – Flandre) Drawing

Provençal period at Cagnes sur Mer

 Rochers – Matinée, La Bocca (Alpes Maritimes), BAM (Beaux-Arts Museum of Mons (Belgium)
 L'Olivier – Cros de Cagnes (Alpes Maritimes), Musée de Cagnes sur Mer (Château Grimaldi)
 Sous les Oliviers – Cros de Cagnes (Alpes Maritimes)
 La Jarre Bleue – Cagnes sur Mer (Alpes Maritimes)
 Cros de Cagnes (Alpes Maritimes), private Collection
 Lumière d'été à Cagnes sur Mer (Alpes Maritimes), private Collection
 Nuit (St Paul du Var) Drawing and Charcoal, private Collection

Back in Belgium during the Great War

Painter joins the general staff at La Panne as army painter with, in particular, the Belgium painter Alfred Bastien as companion. Many paintings and, especially,  very gloomy charcoals, showing ruins and damages at the front of Yser.
 Ruines à Reninghe 1917 (Flandre), private Collection
 Front de l'Yser en 1917 (Flandre), private Collection

Vaux le Pénil near Melun (Seine et Marne)

 L'inondation – La Seine à Vaux le Pénil (Seine et Marne), private Collection
 Le Chemin de la Mare des Champs (Vaux le Pénil)
 Saint Liesne (Vaux le Pénil)
 Coin de Parc (Vaux le Pénil), Musée Royal de l'Armée et d'Histoire Militaire, Bruxelles (Belgique)
 La rue Couvet (Vaux le Pénil) Sketch
 Soir (Vaux le Pénil)

Move to Chamant (Oise) near Senlis (France)

 Abandon (Chamant – Oise), private Collection
 La Meule – Temps Gris à Chamant (Chamant – Oise)
 Rue – (Chamant – Oise), private Collection
 La Mare Forêt d'Halatte (Oise), private Collection
 A la Corne du Parc – Soir à Chamant (Chamant – Oise)
 Meules au soleil (Chamant – Oise)
 Conte de Fées – Forêt d'Halatte (Oise)
 Route – Balagny (Oise)
 Le Miroir d'eau – Château d'Ognon (Ognon – Oise), collections du Musée de la Vénerie (Senlis, Oise)
 Silence – Château d'Ognon (Ognon – Oise)
 Poème d'Automne dans le Parc du Château d'Ognon (Ognon – Oise)
 Effet de Neige (Chamant – Oise)
 Le Braconnier (Forêt d'Halatte)
 Place de Saint Frambourg (Senlis – Oise) Dessin, collections du Musée de la Vénerie (Senlis, Oise)
 La Rue de la Tonnellerie (Senlis – Oise) Dessin, collections du Musée de la Vénerie (Senlis, Oise)
 Escalier dans le parc d'Ognon (Ognon – Oise) Dessin, collections du Musée de la Vénerie (Senlis, Oise)
 Meules et chemin à Chamant Dessin, collections du Musée de la Vénerie (Senlis, Oise)
 Escalier dans le jardin d'Ognon (Ognon – Oise) Drawing, collections du Musée de la Vénerie (Senlis, Oise)

Sojourn in Brittany at St Jacut de la Mer near St Malo

 Pointe de la Goule aux Fées (Saint Enogat – Ille et Vilaine), private Collection
 Vaguelettes – Saint Jacut -Ille et Vilaine
 Le Port de Saint Jacut -Ille et Vilaine
 Les Ebiens – Saint Jacut -Ille et Vilaine

Quercynoise period at Gourdon (France) and Carennac (France)

 Chemin à (Carennac – Lot), private Collection
 Le Cloître (Carennac – Lot), private Collection
 Le Pont de Carennac (Lot)
 Le Vieil escalier (Carennac – Lot), BAM (Beaux-Arts Museum of Mons (Belgium)
 L'Hôte invisible (Carennac – Lot), BAM (Beaux-Arts Museum of Mons (Belgium)
 Dordogne – Vue sur Castelnau Bretenoux (Lot), private Collection
 Une Rue à Gourdon (Lot)
 Décoration de la Basilique de Rocamadour (Lot), personages de l'histoire de France : Roland, Saint Louis, Jean le Bon, Charles le Bel, Philippe d'Alsace, Henri II, Blanche de Castille, Louis XI, Marie de Luxembourg
 Vitraux de l'Eglise de Creysse Lot
 Vitraux de l'Eglise de Goudou Lot

Still lifes

 La Théière bleue
 Cuivre et Pommes
 La Théière Noire
 Le Monstre, BAM (Beaux-Arts Museum of Mons (Belgium)
 La Nappe à carreaux
 Pâtissons
 Courges et Aubergines
 Pommes (Coin de Table)
 Deux Pommes
 La Pie morte, private Collection
 La Belle Pêche
 Le Confiturier ancien
 Fruits, private Collection
 Pommes et Fèves

Portraits

 The blue Portrait, BAM (Beaux-Arts Museum of Mons (Belgium)
 Portrait (Study)
 Portrait of M.M., Canon of Assises, BAM (Beaux-Arts Museum of Mons (Belgium)
 Autoportrait, private Collection
 Autoportrait, in his atelier with his palette and his mock, Musée Royal de l'Armée et d'Histoire Militaire, Bruxelles (Belgique)
 Portrait of Mme Georges Lebacq, private Collection
 Portrait of Mademoiselle Lebacq, Musée Royal de l'Armée et d'Histoire Militaire, Bruxelles (Belgique)
 Portrait of Georges Lebacq (Son) child, private Collection
 Portrait of Georges Lebacq (Son) child (charcoal), private collection
 Portrait of Henri Lebacq (Son), private Collection
 Portrait of the Painter, private Collection

Miscellaneous
 Illustration des "Contes à la Nichée" de Hubert Stiernet 1909
 Illustration des "Petits Contes en sabot" de Louis Delattre 1923
 Fresque allégorique:

Gallery

References

 La Revue Moderne (15 novembre 1921)
 Salon des Artistes Français de 1927
 La Revue Moderne (15 janvier 1924)
 La Revue du Vrai et du Beau (25 mars 1924)
 Les Artistes d'aujourd'hui (15 juin 1927)
 La Revue Moderne (30 juin 1927)
 La Revue du Vrai et du Beau (25 juillet 1927)
 Bulletin de Notre-Dame de Rocamadour N°51 (septembre 1927)
 Les Artistes d'aujourd'hui (1er octobre 1927)
 Les Artistes d'aujourd'hui (15 avril 1928)
 Les Artistes d'aujourd'hui (1er juin 1928)
 La Revue du Vrai et du Beau (10 juin 1928)
 La Revue Moderne (15 juin 1928)
 Le Nord Littéraire et Artistique (juillet-août 1928)
 Bulletin de Notre-Dame de Rocamadour N°62 (août-septembre 1928)
 Les Artistes d'aujourd'hui (15 mai 1929)
 La Revue du Vrai et du Beau (10 juin 1929)
 Bulletin de Notre-Dame de Rocamadour N°71 (juin 1929)
 La Revue du Vrai et du Beau (10 juillet 1930)
 La Revue du Vrai et du Beau (28 juin 1931)
 Bulletin de Notre-Dame de Rocamadour N°123 (novembre 1933)
 Bulletin de Notre-Dame de Rocamadour N°130 (août 1934)
 Bulletin de Notre-Dame de Rocamadour N°142 (septembre 1935)
 Les Artistes d'aujourd'hui (1er juillet 1936)
 La Revue des Arts (juillet 1936)

External links

 Musée de Cagnes sur mer (Château Grimaldi)
 Musée de la Vénerie à Senlis (Oise)
 Musée des Beaux-Arts de Mons (Belgique)
 Musée Royal de l'Armée et d'Histoire Militaire, Bruxelles (Belgique)
  Musée d'Art Moderne de Paris (MAM)
 Georges Émile Lebacq dans la *base joconde

Lebacq